The Council of Ministers (1970–77) of Legislative Assembly, Kerala state (better known as C. Achutha Menon ministry - second term) was the Council of Ministers, the executive wing of state government, in the Indian state of Kerala. The ministry was led (Chief Minister) by Communist Party of India leader C. Achutha Menon from 4 October 1970 to 25 March 1977 and had twenty three ministers at various periods.

Ministers

Resignations
N K Seshan resigned w.e.f. 2 April 1970 and O. Koran resigned w.e.f. 1 August 1970

See also
 United Front (Kerala), the coalition that ruled the state from 1970 to 1977 and from 1977 to 1979

References

 https://web.archive.org/web/20160708185932/http://www.prd.kerala.gov.in/ministers49_main.htm

Menon 02
Communist Party of India state ministries
1970 establishments in Kerala
1977 disestablishments in India
Cabinets established in 1970
Cabinets disestablished in 1977